Miss Brazil World 2012 was the 23rd edition of the Miss Brazil World pageant and 7th under MMB Productions & Events. The contest took place on April 2, 2012. Representatives from various cities all throughout Brazil competed for the Brazilian crown for Miss World. Juceila Bueno of Rio Grande do Sul crowned Mariana Notarângelo of Rio de Janeiro at the end of the contest. Notarângelo represented Brazil at Miss World 2012. The contest was held at the Rede Pampa Studios in Porto Alegre, Rio Grande do Sul, Brazil.

Results

Special Awards

Contestants
The contestants for Miss Brazil World 2012 were:

 - Camila Reis
 - Daniella Borçato
 - Morgana Mello
 - Josilene Modesto
 - Larissa Costa
 - Cecília Stadler
 - Kellin Schmidt
 - Flávia Monteiro
 Estados Unidos-Brasil - Carol Lassance
 - Evelly Barbosa
 - Mariana Albuquerque
 - Juliane Késsia
 - Aline Sales
 - Priscila Winny
 - Benazira Djoco
 - Larissa Almeida
 - Érica Henrique
 - Isabelle Sampaio
 - Karine Barros
 - Luzielle Vasconcellos
 - Mayra Albuquerque
 - Kahuany Tufaile
 - Mariana Notarângelo
 - Késsia Cortez
 - Andressa Mello
 - Paula Helwanger
 - Dionara Lermen
 - Mariana Bahtke
 - Ana Cecília Cunha
 - Mariane Silvestre
 - Camila Serakides

References

External links
 Official site (in Portuguese)

2012
2012 in Brazil
2012 beauty pageants